Keshishkend or Keshishkent may refer to:
 Gegharot, Armenia
 Yeghegnadzor, Armenia
 Keşişkənd, Azerbaijan